Jyväskylä Airport is an airport in Jyväskylä, Finland. The airport terminal was renovated in the fall of 2004.

The Air Force Academy Flight School and the Air Force Academy Supporting Air Operations Wing are stationed at the airport. The main campus of the Air Force Academy is about 5 kilometers from the airport. The Aviation Museum of Central Finland is located near the airport.

History
The airport was founded as an air-force base in 1939. The first commercial flight left the airport 6 years later in 1945.

On August 2, 2010, Finncomm Airlines announced it will stop its service between Helsinki and Jyväskylä on August 16, 2010. However the break was very short as Finnair and Finncomm reached an agreement in September 2010 that Finncomm will take over several Finnair's domestic routes. As a result of that, Finnair stopped its flights to Jyväskylä in late October 2010 and Finncomm started to operate those flights as co-operation with Finnair. On September 9, 2011, Finnair announced that they will end flights to Jyväskylä, the last flight would be on October 29, 2011. Finnair flights to Jyväskylä had been operated by Finncomm Airlines. Finnair has been responsible for ticket sales on the route, Finncomm being solely the operator. After the joint acquisition of Finncomm Airlines by Finnair and Flybe Nordic, it was announced that the link to Helsinki would be taken over by the new FlyBe Nordic on 30 October. The service between Helsinki and Jyväskylä was then operated by NyxAir until the spring of 2021, when it became non-operational; a new PSO tender re-enabled a twice-daily service which started operating October 31, 2022.

Airlines and destinations
The following airlines operate regular scheduled and charter flights at Jyväskylä  Airport:

Statistics

Ground transport
Bus-line number 22 goes from nearby suburb to the downtown Jyväskylä. Taxi is available on request.

See also 
List of the largest airports in the Nordic countries

References

External links

 Finavia – Jyväskylä Airport
 AIP Finland – Jyväskylä Airport

Airports in Finland
Airport
Buildings and structures in Central Finland